The Howling Miller is a 1981 novel by the Finnish author Arto Paasilinna.

The protagonist of the story, which is set in Finnish Lapland around 1950, is a man by the name of Gunnar Huttunen, who settles in a small village to mend and run a derelict mill. Huttunen is an enterprising and resourceful man, a hard worker, proudly independent but generally good-natured. However, his peculiar personality, particularly his habit of howling to vent his emotions, turns the intolerant villagers and authorities against him, and he is eventually committed into a mental hospital. After escaping, Huttunen lives as a fugitive in the wilderness, aided by his few friends: his lover Sanelma, the local police constable Portimo, and the postman and moonshiner Piittisjärvi. After a final confrontation with the law, Huttunen disappears, never to be heard from again.

The book has been translated into several languages. It has twice been adapted into a feature film: a Finnish one called Ulvova mylläri (1982) and a French one, Cornélius, le meunier hurlant (2017).

Notes

References
 Arto Paasilinna, Will Hobson (tr.). The Howling Miller.  (2007, 1st ed.)

External links

Reviews
 The Howling Miller at The New York Times Book Review
 The Howling Miller at The Guardian
 The Howling Miller at The Los Angeles Times
 The Howling Miller at The Skinny
 The Howling Miller at The Complete Review
 The Howling Miller at University of Rochester
 The Howling Miller at Goodreads (public comments)

Movies
 The Internet Movie Database about the movie version of The Howling Miller
 Finnish Movie Center's article about the movie Ulvova Mylläri 

1981 novels
Finnish comedy novels
Novels set in Finland
Novels by Arto Paasilinna
Picaresque novels
Satirical novels
Fictional millers
20th-century Finnish novels